Hilary Elin Estey McLoughlin (born August 6, 1962) is a television producer and development executive. Estey McLoughlin most recently served as Senior Executive Producer of The View and non fiction content for ABC News, where she oversaw the development of new multiplatform series. Estey McLoughlin was let go from The View and ABC News in December 2020 as part of company-wide layoffs. Estey McLoughlin's last day was February 8, 2021, and was given an on-air farewell tribute by the co-hosts of The View.

Career 
Prior to The View and ABC News, from 2013–2015, Estey McLoughlin served as President of Creative Affairs at CBS Television Distribution, where she oversaw all first-run syndicated programming and operations of veteran franchises such as Judge Judy, Dr. Phil, Rachael Ray, and Entertainment Tonight. While at CBS, Estey McLoughlin also played an integral role in the staffing and launch of The Late Late Show with James Corden.

From 2006–2013, she served as President of Warner Bros. Television's syndication production house Telepictures Productions, where she oversaw all aspects of the company, including programming such as The Rosie O'Donnell Show, The Tyra Banks Show, Ellen, Extra, Judge Mathis and TMZ.

Awards and lists 
Estey McLoughlin is the recipient of several Daytime Emmy Awards:

 One for "Outstanding Talk Show" in her role as the Senior Executive Producer of The View (2020).
 Two for "Outstanding Talk Show" in her role as the Executive Producer of the Rosie O'Donnell Show (1998, 1999)

Additionally, Estey McLoughlin has been featured on the following lists: 
 Variety's 2017 Women's Impact Report
 Variety's The New Power New York List (2016)
 The Hollywood Reporter's Women in Entertainment Power 100 List (2014, 2012, 2011, 2010, 2009)

Early life and education 
Hilary Estey McLoughlin was born in Forest Hills, New York and studied communications at Boston University.

References

External links

Telepictures Productions Official Website
CBS Television Distribution Official Website

American television executives
Women television executives
1962 births
Living people